is a former international table tennis player from Japan.

Table tennis career
From 1973 to 1976 she won several medals in singles, doubles, and team events in the World Table Tennis Championships and in the Asian Table Tennis Championships.

Shew on three World Championship bronze medals; two in the Corbillon Cup (team event) in 1973 and 1975 and one in the doubles with Tazuko Abe at the 1973 World Table Tennis Championships.

See also
 List of table tennis players
 List of World Table Tennis Championships medalists

References

Japanese female table tennis players
Living people
Asian Games medalists in table tennis
Table tennis players at the 1974 Asian Games
Medalists at the 1974 Asian Games
Asian Games silver medalists for Japan
Asian Games bronze medalists for Japan
Year of birth missing (living people)